Events in the year 1879 in Iceland.

Incumbents 

 Monarch: Christian IX
 Minister for Iceland: Johannes Nellemann

Events 

 Geirfuglasker erupts (submarine).

Births 

 6 February – Magnús Guðmundsson, politician
 6 February – Björn Þórðarson,  prime minister of Iceland

Deaths 

 19 June – Vilhelmína Lever, 77, shopkeeper
 7 December – Jón Sigurðsson, 68, leader of the Icelandic independence movement.

References 

 
1870s in Iceland
Years of the 19th century in Iceland
Iceland
Iceland